Alec Cobbe (born 1945) is an Irish designer, artist, musical instrument collector and decorator.

A member of the Cobbe family, Cobbe was born in Dublin and moved to Newbridge House with his family upon the death of his father. Cobbe studied medicine at Corpus Christi College, Oxford, and underwent his clinical training at the London Hospital. Cobbe gave up his study of medicine to become a painter and trained as an art conservator at the Tate. Since the early 1980s Cobbe has advised on the redecoration of historic British country houses.

Cobbe donated his design archive to the Victoria and Albert Museum (V&A) and an exhibition was held at the V&A of his work in 2013.

The Cobbe Collection, Cobbe's collection of historic musical instruments is kept at Hatchlands Park, a National Trust property that Cobbe has leased since 1984.

References

External links
The Cobbe Collection of instruments

Further reading

Living people
1945 births
Alumni of Corpus Christi College, Oxford
20th-century British painters
21st-century British painters
21st-century male artists
English interior designers
Artists from Dublin (city)
Museum people from Dublin (city)